Ken Sier (27 January 1922 – 23 February 2001) was an Australian rules footballer who played with Richmond and Fitzroy in the Victorian Football League (VFL) during the 1940s.

His best year came in 1944 where he kicked 41 goals as a full forward, 3 of them in the 1944 VFL Grand Final victory over his future club Richmond.

In December 1946, Sier was appointed as captain / coach of the Border United Football Club, in Corowa, NSW.

In January, 1947, it was announced that Fitzroy refused Sier a clearance to coach Border United Football Club at £10 per week.

References

External links

2004 obituary of Maurie Hearn, mentioning Clen Denning and Laurie Bickerton as the surviving members of the Maroons' 1944 side

1922 births
Australian rules footballers from Victoria (Australia)
Fitzroy Football Club players
Fitzroy Football Club Premiership players
Richmond Football Club players
2001 deaths
One-time VFL/AFL Premiership players